Backstage (Italian: Retroscena) is a 1939 Italian comedy film directed by Alessandro Blasetti and starring Filippo Romito, Elisa Cegani and Camillo Pilotto. It is part of the tradition of White Telephone films, popular in Italy during the era.

The film's sets were designed by the art director Gastone Medin. It was shot at Cinecittà in Rome and on location in Naples and Pisa.

Cast
 Filippo Romito as Il baritone Alberto De Sanni 
 Elisa Cegani as Diana Martelli - la pianista 
 Camillo Pilotto as Parsifal Bernocchio 
 Lia Orlandini as Mirna Martelli - la zia di Diana 
 Enzo Biliotti as Silvio Dentice 
 Ugo Ceseri as Terenzio 
 Giovanni Grasso as Il commissario 
 Fausto Guerzoni as Il vice commissario 
 Ermanno Roveri as Un giornalista 
 Romolo Costa as Sablonscky 
 Mario Pucci as Il portiere dell'albergo 
 Oretta Fiume as La fioraia a bordo 
 Cesare Zoppetti as Il portiere dell'uscita degli artisti 
 Federico Collino as Il portiere dell'entrata al palcoscenico 
 Achille Majeroni as Un signore a bordo 
 Sandro Dani as Il funzionario della stazione 
 Nino Eller as Il controllore alla stazione 
 Nino Crisman as Un cameriere a bordo

References

Bibliography
Gundle, Stephen. Mussolini's Dream Factory: Film Stardom in Fascist Italy. Berghahn Books, 2013.

External links 

1939 films
Italian comedy films
1939 comedy films
1930s Italian-language films
Films directed by Alessandro Blasetti
Films shot at Cinecittà Studios
Italian black-and-white films
Films scored by Alessandro Cicognini
1930s Italian films

it:Retroscena (film 1939)